James Murdoch (25 January 1930 – 25 October 2010) was an Australian arts administrator, musicologist, composer, journalist, broadcaster, and founder and inaugural director of the Australian Music Centre. He was an outstanding champion of Australian music, and was a leading light in the promotion of Peggy Glanville-Hicks.

Biography
James Murdoch was a son of a wharf labourer and born an only child in the Sydney suburb of Paddington. His parents were frequently on the move and by the age of 14, Murdoch had lived in 19 houses and attended 15 schools.

An autodidact, he learned all he could about music of all genres, from medieval times to the present day.  He also learnt cello, flute, piano and violin at the Sydney Conservatorium of Music.

Murdoch gravitated to bohemian circles, and befriended Tilly Devine, Bea Miles, and Sunday Reed. He became close friends with other members of the Heide Circle as well.

In 1958, Murdoch was engaged by a Spanish dance theatre as well as toured in Australia as their international pianist under the name Jaime Sebastian. He toured with them in Europe, the United Kingdom and elsewhere. He also assumed the conductor's podium for the company on the strength of his (untrue) claim that he had conducted student orchestras at the Sydney Conservatorium.

He composed two ballets for the dance troupe. One of them is La Espera in which received 450 performances in Europe and Australia. After touring Australia under his assumed name, in 1962, he opted to remain in his home country despite his misgivings about Australian society and culture.

Murdoch became an Assistant Musical Director and company pianist of the new Australian Ballet company. From 1964 until 1968 he was deeply involved in the World Record Club "inter alia", writing over 200 record cover notes each year.

During the 1950s and 1960s, Murdoch was an active member of the International Society for Contemporary Music (ISCM), serving as Secretary of its Melbourne, Sydney and other Australian branches. In 1965, Murdoch directed the First Festival of Contemporary Music in Melbourne.

Murdoch developed a painful contraction of the tendons through overuse of his hands and switched his career from being a pianist to a concert promoter based in London. His company managed people like Cathy Berberian, Harrison Birtwistle, Leo Brouwer, Paul Crossley, Peter Maxwell Davies and the Pierrot Players (later known as the Fires of London), Hans Werner Henze, Igor Kipnis, Roger Woodward, and the Budapest Chamber Orchestra.

He was associated with the filmmaker Ken Russell and assisted in organizing the music for The Devils and The Boyfriend (both 1971).

In 1973, Murdoch was the first musical adviser to the Australia Council. In 1975, he was appointed to be the first National Director of the Australian Music Centre (AMC) and in 1980, was elected to be the world president of the Music Information Centres Professional Branch.

In 1981, Murdoch was sacked by the Music Board of the Australia Council, the funding body for the AMC, for what they perceived as inept financial administration, which they felt could not overcome his acknowledged superb vision and advocacy. He was then rehired as music consultant to the Australia Council, but was dismissed again when they deemed as inadequate his report into the state of music publishing in Australia. He responded by suing the board for unfair dismissal- which later ended in an out-of-court settlement.

Since 1984, Murdoch have recorded 60 filmed interviews with leading writers, composers and artists, now held at the National Film and Sound Archive.

As a passionate champion of Australian music and performers, he influenced composers like Richard Meale and Peggy Glanville-Hicks to return from self-imposed artistic exile overseas. After Glanville-Hicks died in 1990, he championed the Peggy Glanville-Hicks Composers Trust and Peggy Glanville-Hicks House, and he researched and wrote her biography, Peggy Glanville-Hicks – A Transposed Life (2002).

Personal life 
Murdoch never married. In 1990 he moved to the Indonesian island of Bali, where he remained extremely active in both Australian and Asian arts circles. He died there, aged 80, in 2010. 

His voluminous papers are lodged with the National Library of Australia.

Chopin's walking stick
Murdoch inherited a walking stick that had belonged to Frédéric Chopin. It had been given to Chopin by the monks at Valldemossa, the monastery he and George Sand stayed at on Majorca in 1838–39. Chopin returned it to the monks when he left. In 1934 the writer Robert Graves took up residence near there, and the monks gave the walking stick to him. Graves gave it to Peggy Glanville-Hicks when she stayed with him while they discussed his libretto for her opera Nausicaa, based on Graves's book Homer's Daughter. She gave it to the American pianist Oliver Daniels. After Daniels' death, his partner gave it to Murdoch, who took it to Bali. Before his death he gave it to his friend Shane Simpson in Sydney.

Bibliography
 Australia's Contemporary Composers (1972)
 Notes on a Landscape (a documentary film on 10 Australian composers, with Bill Fitzwater; 1980)
 Handbook of Australian Music (1983)
 The Arts on Film (1988)
 Peggy Glanville-Hicks – A Transposed Life (2002)

Sources
 Australian Music Centre: James Murdoch (1930–2010)
 James Murdoch Remembered
 David Leser, "Song of an Exile", The Sydney Morning Herald, 13 September 1997, Good Weekend magazine, p. 40

References

1930 births
2010 deaths
Australian classical pianists
Male classical pianists
Australian arts administrators
Australian broadcasters
Australian composers
Australian biographers
Australian musicologists
Australian journalists
Sydney Conservatorium of Music alumni